In human anatomy, the head is at the top of the human body. It supports the face and is maintained by the skull, which itself encloses the brain.

Structure 

The human head consists of a fleshy outer portion, which surrounds the bony skull. The brain is enclosed within the skull.  There are 22 bones in the human head. The head rests on the neck, and the seven cervical vertebrae support it. The human head typically weighs between  Over 98% of humans fit into this range. There have been odd incidences where human beings have abnormally small or large heads. The Zika virus was responsible for underdeveloped heads in the early 2000s.

The face is the anterior part of the head, containing the eyes, nose, and mouth. On either side of the mouth, the cheeks provide a fleshy border to the oral cavity. The ears sit to either side of the head.

Blood supply
The head receives blood supply through the internal and external carotid arteries. These supply the area outside of the skull (external carotid artery) and inside of the skull (internal carotid artery). The area inside the skull also receives blood supply from the vertebral arteries, which travel up through the cervical vertebrae.

Nerve supply

The twelve pairs of cranial nerves provide the majority of nervous control to the head. The sensation to the face is provided by the branches of the trigeminal nerve, the fifth cranial nerve. Sensation to other portions of the head is provided by the cervical nerves.

Modern texts are in agreement about which areas of the skin are served by which nerves, but there are minor variations in some of the details. The borders designated by diagrams in the 1918 edition of Gray's Anatomy are similar but not identical to those generally accepted today.

The cutaneous innervation of the head is as follows:

Ophthalmic nerve (green)
Maxillary nerve (pink)
Mandibular nerve (yellow)
Cervical plexus (purple)
Dorsal rami of cervical nerves (blue) and others are in picture which show following in upper column

Function 

The head contains sensory organs: two eyes, two ears, a nose and tongue inside of the mouth. It also houses the brain. Together, these organs function as a processing center for the body by relaying sensory information to the brain. Humans can process information faster by having this central nerve cluster.

Society and culture
For humans, the front of the head (the face) is the main distinguishing feature between different people due to its easily discernible features, such as eye and hair colors, shapes of the sensory organs, and the wrinkles. Humans easily differentiate between faces because of the brain's predisposition toward facial recognition. When observing a relatively unfamiliar species, all faces seem nearly identical. Human infants are biologically programmed to recognize subtle differences in anthropomorphic facial features.

People who have greater than average intelligence are sometimes depicted in cartoons as having bigger heads as a way of notionally indicating that they have a "larger brain". Additionally, in science fiction, an extraterrestrial having a big head is often symbolic of high intelligence. Despite this depiction, advances in neurobiology have shown that the functional diversity of the brain means that a difference in overall brain size is only slightly to moderately correlated to differences in overall intelligence between two humans.

The head is a source for many metaphors and metonymies in human language, including referring to things typically near the human head ( "the head of the bed"), things physically similar to the way a head is arranged spatially to a body ("the head of the table"), metaphorically ("the head of the class"), and things that represent some characteristics associated with the head, such as intelligence ("there are a lot of good heads in this company").

Ancient Greeks had a method for evaluating sexual attractiveness based on the Golden ratio, part of which included measurements of the head.

Headhunting is the practice of taking and preserving a person's head after killing the person. Headhunting has been practiced across the Americas, Europe, Asia, and Oceania for millennia.

Clothing

Headpieces can signify status, origin, religious/spiritual beliefs, social grouping, team affiliation, occupation, or fashion choices.

In many cultures, covering the head is seen as a sign of respect. Often, some or all of the head must be covered and veiled when entering holy places or places of prayer. For many centuries, women in Europe, the Middle East, and South Asia have covered their head hair as a sign of modesty. This trend has changed drastically in Europe in the 20th century, although is still observed in other parts of the world. In addition, a number of religions require men to wear specific head clothing—such as the Islamic taqiyah, Jewish yarmulke, or the Sikh turban. The same goes for women with the Muslim hijab or Christian nun's habit.

A hat is a head covering that can serve a variety of purposes. Hats may be worn as part of a uniform or used as a protective device, such as a hard hat, a covering for warmth, or a fashion accessory. Hats can also be indicative of social status in some areas of the world.

Anthropometry

While numerous charts detailing head sizes in infants and children exist, most do not measure average head circumference past the age of 21. Reference charts for adult head circumference also generally feature homogeneous samples and fail to take height and weight into account.

A British study by Newcastle University showed an average size of 57.2 cm for males and 55.2 cm for females with average size varying proportionally with height 

Macrocephaly can be an indicator of increased risk for some types of cancer in individuals who carry the genetic mutation that causes Cowden syndrome. For adults, this refers to head sizes greater than 58 centimeters in men or greater than 57 centimeters in women.

Average head sizes

Some values in the table below may not be correct. In particular, a random biocular breadth measurement showed a value of 101.6 mm for an average adult male. The first percentile value below is 110 mm for an adult male.  Another user has also indicate around 100 mm being an average value for biocular breadth. Therefore, the biocular breadth values appear to be increased by around 22 mm.

See also 
 Human body
 Head and neck anatomy
 Heads in heraldry

References

Further reading 

 Campbell, Bernard Grant. Human Evolution: An Introduction to Man's Adaptations, 4th edition.